Virginia K. DeMarchi is currently a U.S. Magistrate Judge of the United States District Court for the Northern District of California.

Education
Judge DeMarchi graduated with an A.B. with distinction from Stanford University in 1990, and obtained a Juris Doctor from Harvard Law School cum laude in 1993.

Career

Clerkship
Upon graduation from law school, Judge DeMarchi served as a federal judicial law clerk for the Honorable Steven J. McAuliffe, U.S. District Judge of the U.S. District Court for the District of New Hampshire.

Department of Justice
After her clerkship, Judge DeMarchi served for two years as a Trial Attorney with the Civil Division of the United States Department of Justice (or the Civil Division of the United States Justice Department)  in Washington D.C.

Fenwick & West
After her work at the Department of Justice, Judge DeMarchi joined the firm of Fenwick & West, where she became Partner and practiced for 22 years. At Fenwick & West, Judge Demarchi represented various life sciences and high technology company clients in intellectual property matters such as patent infringement cases, and also handled patent or intellectual property matters in industries including computer software and hardware, pharmaceuticals, e-commerce, industrial enzymes, financial services, medical devices, consumer products and communication networks. Judge DeMarchi has also served as general counsel to Fenwick & West and as a member of the firm's Executive Committee.

In addition to her private practice at Fenwick & West, Judge DeMarchi has also been active in the pro bono representation of state and federal inmates as well as victims of domestic violence, and also served for nearly a decade on the Board of Directors for the Law Foundation of Silicon Valley.

Judicial Service
Judge DeMarchi was appointed on June 4, 2018. She filled the vacated magistrate judgeship left by the retirement of U.S. Magistrate Judge Howard Lloyd. She currently sits in the San Jose division of the Northern District of California.

Links
The Honorable Virginia K. DeMarchi, U.S. Magistrate Judge, United States District Court for the Northern District of California
Court Selects Palo Alto Litigator Virginia K. DeMarchi for San Jose Magistrate Judgeship

References

See also
United States District Court for the Northern District of California
United States Court of Appeals for the Ninth Circuit

Living people
American lawyers
Stanford University alumni
United States magistrate judges
People from San Jose, California
21st-century American judges
Harvard Law School alumni
Year of birth missing (living people)